The Prison (French La prison) is a 1968 novel by Georges Simenon. The dur tale of a husband informed by the police that his wife has shot her sister, the novel takes similar themes to Simenon's domestic crisis novels Lettre à mon juge and La Main.

References

1968 Belgian novels
Novels by Georges Simenon